An eternal flame is a memorial consisting of a perpetually burning flame.

Eternal flame or eternal fire may also refer to:

Memorials
Eternal Flame (Azerbaijan)
Eternal Flame (Belgrade)
Eternal flame (Sarajevo)
John F. Kennedy Eternal Flame

Books
"The Eternal Flame", the second book in the Orthogonal trilogy by Greg Egan
Merlin Book 11: The Eternal Flame, the third book in The Great Tree of Avalon trilogy by T. A. Barron

Music
Eternal Flame (album), by Do As Infinity
Eternal Flame (band), a Dutch rock band
"The Eternal Flame", a song from the 2005 album The Circle of Life by Freedom Call
"Eternal Flame" (song), a 1988 song by The Bangles
"Eternal Flame", a song by Mystic Prophecy from the album Regressus

Other
Eternal Flame Falls, a waterfall in New York State, USA, which features a natural gas flame
Shalleh-ye Javiyd (English: Eternal Flame), a Maoist political party in Afghanistan
Eternal Fire (film), a 1985 Spanish film
The Eternal Flame (film), a 1922 silent film
Eternal Fire (esports), a Turkish esports organization

See also
 The Eternal Frame, 1975 artwork
 Eternal light (disambiguation)
 Sacred fire (disambiguation)